The Castle Valley is a valley in Carbon, Emery, and Sevier counties in Utah, United States.

Note:
 There is a different Castle Valley in Utah, in Grand County.
 The town of Castle Valley is in Grand County, and is named for nearby castle-like rock formations.

See also

 List of valleys of Utah

References

External links

Valleys of Utah
Landforms of Carbon County, Utah
Landforms of Emery County, Utah
Landforms of Sevier County, Utah